In Records may refer to:

 In Records (United States), a record label started in 1964
 In Records (Australia), an Australian record label of the 1960s